The 2017 season is Sandefjord's first season back in the Tippeligaen following their relegation in 2015.

Squad

Transfers

Winter

In:

Out:

Summer

In:

Out:

Competitions

Eliteserien

Results summary

Results by round

Results

Table

Norwegian Cup

Squad statistics

Appearances and goals

|-
|colspan="14"|Players away from Sandefjord on loan:'
'
|-
|colspan="14"|Players who left Sandefjord during the season:''

|}

Goal scorers

Disciplinary record

References

Sandefjord Fotball seasons
Sandefjord